The 2020–21 season was FC Ararat-Armenia's 3rd season in Armenian Premier League, of which they were defending champions. Ararat-Armenia finished the season in 5th position, reached the semifinals of the Armenian Cup, the first qualifying round of the UEFA Champions League and the playoff round of the UEFA Europa League.

Season events
After Vardan Minasyan left the club on 17 July 2020 after his contract expired, Ararat-Armenia announced the appointment of David Campaña as their new manager on 22 July.

On 23 July, Ararat-Armenia announced the signing of Alemão from Oliveirense.

On 25 July, Ararat-Armenia announced the signing of Sargis Shahinyan from Lori.

On 30 July, Ararat-Armenia announced the departure of Gor Malakyan after his contract expired.

On 5 August, Ararat-Armenia announced the signing of David Bollo, whilst Artyom Avanesyan joined Pyunik on loan for the season.

On 6 August, Van announced the arrival of Davit Nalbandyan on loan from Ararat-Armenia for the season.

On 27 August, Ararat-Armenia announced the signing of Vardan Shapperi from Lori, with fellow goalkeeper Suren Aloyan leaving Ararat-Armenia the following day after his contract was terminated by mutual consent.

On 9 September, Ararat-Armenia announced the signing of Jeisson Martínez after he'd left Fuenlabrada.

On 17 September, Armen Nahapetyan joined Pyunik on loan for the season.

On 18 September, the FFA postponed the match between Ararat Yerevan and Ararat-Armenia due to Ararat-Armenia being involved in a UEFA Europa League match on 24 September.

On 29 September, the 2020–21 Armenian Premier League season was suspended indefinitely due to the escalating 2020 Nagorno-Karabakh conflict. On the same day, Ararat-Armenia's UEFA Europa League Playoff Round match against Red Star Belgrade was moved to the GSP Stadium in Nicosia, Cyprus. On 13 October, the FFA announced that the season would resume on 17 October.

On 16 October, midfielder Kódjo left Ararat-Armenia by mutual consent.

On 29 October, Ararat-Armenia's game scheduled for 31 October against Alashkert was postponed due to 4 positive COVID-19 within the Alashkert team.

On 3 November, Ararat-Armenia's game against Gandzasar Kapan was postponed, after Gandzasar Kapan failed to turn up for the game.

On 7 December, Ararat-Armenia announced the signing of Wbeymar on a free transfer from Gandzasar Kapan.

On 29 December, Ararat-Armenia announced the signing of Dan Spătaru on a free-transfer after his FC Noah contract expired.

On 7 January, Artur Danielyan left Ararat-Armenia after his contract was terminated by mutual consent.

On 15 January, Ararat-Armenia confirmed that Ogana Louis had left the club after his contract had expired, whilst Mailson Lima left the club the following day to sign for Dibba Al-Hisn.

On 19 January, Ararat-Armenia announced the signing of Yehor Klymenchuk.

On 21 January, Ararat-Armenia confirmed that Alex Christian had left the club following the expiration of his contract.

On 22 January, Heradi Rashidi and David Terteryan signed for Ararat-Armenia, whilst Junior Bueno joined on 23 January.

On 27 January, Stefan Čupić was sold to Olympiakos Nicosia for an undisclosed fee. The following day, Hovhannes Harutyunyan was released by Ararat-Armenia.

On 3 February, Ararat-Armenia announced the signing of Nikola Petrić from Proleter Novi Sad.

On 9 February, Ararat-Armenia announced the signing of Aleksandr Karapetyan from Tambov.

On 5 March, David Campaña left his role as Head Coach by mutual consent, with Armen Adamyan being appointed as the Caretaker Head Coach. On 24 March, Ararat-Armenia announced Anatoly Baidachny as their new Head Coach.

Squad

Out on loan

Transfers

In

Out

Loans out

Released

Trial

Friendlies

Competitions

Overall record

Supercup

Premier League

Results summary

Results by round

Results

Table

Armenian Cup

UEFA Champions League

Qualifying rounds

UEFA Europa League

Qualifying rounds

Statistics

Appearances and goals

|-
|colspan="16"|Players away on loan:
|-
|colspan="16"|Players who left Ararat-Armenia during the season:

|}

Goal scorers

Clean sheets

Disciplinary Record

References

FC Ararat-Armenia seasons
Ararat-Armenia
Ararat-Armenia